Pradeep Udawatta (born 12 June 1971) is a Sri Lankan former first-class cricketer. He made his Twenty20 debut on 17 August 2004, for Sri Lanka Police Sports Club in the 2004 SLC Twenty20 Tournament. He is now an umpire and stood in matches between Sri Lanka women and England women in November 2016.

References

External links
 

1971 births
Living people
Sri Lankan cricketers
Sri Lankan cricket umpires
Sri Lanka Police Sports Club cricketers
People from Dehiwala-Mount Lavinia